The 2020 Maryland Republican presidential primary was held on June 2, 2020 along with seven other state nominating contests in the Republican Party presidential primaries for the 2020 presidential election. Donald Trump won the primary and all of the state's 38 delegates. Bill Weld, despite having ended his presidential campaign in March, received his highest share of the popular vote in this primary.

Results

References 

Republican primary
Maryland
Maryland Republican primary
Maryland Republican primaries